Grupo Poma is a family-owned company in El Salvador. The firm is headed by Ricardo Poma. Some of Grupo Poma’s business activities include automobile dealerships, real estate development and construction, industrial manufacturing and hotels, as well as investments in telecommunications and a variety of nonprofit organizations that carry out social projects. As of 2001, Grupo Poma had a total of 10,000 employees.

Group divisions
Grupo Poma is divided into five primary divisions:
 
 Excel Automotriz– Operates in El Salvador since 1919 and also in Guatemala, Honduras, Nicaragua, Costa Rica and Panama. Grupo Poma represents some of the companies in the automotive market, such as Toyota, BMW, Mitsubishi, Chevrolet, Ford and KIA. Excel Automotriz is the biggest automotive distribution company in Central America.
 Grupo Roble– Grupo Roble is a construction subsidiary that builds and manages shopping centers, residential housing and office space. Some of this division's accomplishments include building more than 50,000 homes and 19 shopping malls in Central America.
 Real Hotels and Resorts– The group has nineteen InterContinental, Marriott International and Choice Hotels in Central America, Colombia, the Caribbean and Miami, Florida, United States.
 Grupo Solaire– manufactures windows and aluminum products at four factories in El Salvador.
 Grupo Autofacil– Operates in El Salvador, Colombia, Costa Rica, Guatemala, Honduras and Panama. Grupo Autofacil is the financial division of Grupo Poma. 
 Multiplaza– Operates in El Salvador, Honduras, Panama, Costa Rica, and Colombia. The company was founded in 1990 and specializes in shopping malls. Multplaza has around 20 mall locations across Latin America.

Notes

Companies of El Salvador
San Salvador